The Massachusetts Spy, later subtitled the Worcester Gazette, (est.1770) was a newspaper published by Isaiah Thomas in Boston and in Worcester, Massachusetts, in the 18th century. 
It was a heavily political weekly paper that was constantly on the verge of being suppressed by the Royalist government, from the time of its establishment in 1770 to 1776, during the runup to the American Revolution. In 1771–1773 the Spy featured the essays of several anonymous political commentators who called themselves "Centinel," "Mucius Scaevola" and "Leonidas." They spoke in the same terms about similar issues, kept Patriot polemics on the front page, and supported each other against attacks in pro-government papers. Rhetorical combat was a Patriot tactic that explained the issues of the day and fostered cohesiveness without advocating outright rebellion. The columnists spoke to the colonists as an independent people tied to Britain only by voluntary legal compact. The Spy soon carried radicalism to its logical conclusion. When articles from the Spy were reprinted in other papers, as the country as a whole was ready for Thomas Paine's Common Sense (1776). The newspaper had to be removed from Boston to Worcester "after the April 6, 1775 issue" just before the Battles of Lexington and Concord and the subsequent Siege of Boston to prevent the arrest of the publisher and printers and the presses from being seized and destroyed by the British; it resumed publication in Worcester on 3 May 1775. The paper was later published by the son of Isaiah Thomas, Isaiah Thomas, Jr. and continued under similar names and different owners until some time in the first decades of the 19th century.

References

Further reading

 Humphrey, Carol Sue. "Greater Distance= Declining Interest: Massachusetts Printers and Protections for a Free Press, 1783–1791." American Journalism 9.3–4 (1992): 12–19.
 Martin, Thomas S. "The Long and the Short of It: A Newspaper Exchange on the Massachusetts Charters, 1772." The William and Mary Quarterly, Third Series, Vol. 43, No. 1 (Jan., 1986), pp. 99–110
 York, Neil L. "Tag-Team Polemics: The" Centinel" and His Allies in the" Massachusetts Spy"." Proceedings of the Massachusetts Historical Society. Vol. 107. 1995.

Newspapers published in Boston
18th century in Boston
Defunct newspapers published in Massachusetts